Włodzimierz Szwendrowski (1931–2013) was an international speedway rider from Poland.

Speedway career 
Szwendrowski was the champion of Poland on two occasions, winning the Polish Individual Speedway Championship in 1951 and 1955.

References 

1931 births
2013 deaths
Polish speedway riders